The Columbia River Bridge, also known as the Bridgeport Bridge, at Bridgeport, Washington, was built to span the Columbia River in 1950. Composed of three spans, the bridge is a steel continuous riveted deck truss carrying Washington State Route 17 on a  roadway and two  sidewalks. The center portion of the bridge spans , flanked by  end spans. The bridge played a significant role in the construction of the Chief Joseph Dam just upstream, as no bridge crossing had previously existed in the area. Construction on the dam started in 1945 and was completed, apart from the powerplant, in 1955. The bridge was designed and built by the U.S. Army Corps of Engineers as part of the Chief Joseph Dam project, and is significant for its association with the project and as a major crossing of the Columbia.

The bridge was placed on the National Register of Historic Places on May 31, 1995.

See also
List of bridges documented by the Historic American Engineering Record in Washington (state)

References

External links

Road bridges on the National Register of Historic Places in Washington (state)
Transportation buildings and structures in Okanogan County, Washington
Bridges in Douglas County, Washington
Truss bridges in the United States
Bridges over the Columbia River
Historic American Engineering Record in Washington (state)
National Register of Historic Places in Douglas County, Washington
Bridges completed in 1950
1950 establishments in Washington (state)
Steel bridges in the United States
Plate girder bridges in the United States